The Ħal Ġinwi temple was a prehistoric megalithic temple site located southeast of Żejtun, Malta dating back to the Ġgantija phase (3600–3200 BCE). The site is located in an area bearing the same name, or alternatively Ħal Ġilwi, which is known for its archaeological remains, and lies around one kilometre from the Tas-Silġ multi-period sanctuary and archaeological site.

History 
Remains of the temple at Ħal Ġinwi were found in the vicinity of San Niklaw chapel, to the right of the main road from Żejtun to Marsaxlokk, between Żejtun and the Tas-Silġ temple. The site is today represented by a few ashlar blocks still visible in a field wall. More remains may survive beneath the soil, since its excavation was superficial. The site was originally excavated by Albert V. Laferla in 1917. Architect Albert E. Vassallo drew the site during Laferla’s archaeological excavations. Themistocles Zammit, however, interpreted the remains as a possible domestic dwelling. John D. Evans suggested that the megalithic structures resemble more a dual temple site.

Archaeology 
The site has five semi-rectangular rooms enclosed within a megalithic wall, and like Tal-Qadi temple, it had an anomalous form when compared with other megalithic temples in Malta. The floors were paved in hard stone or covered in beaten earth (Maltese: torba). Many pottery shards were found on site, and stone whorls, while flint and chert remains were scarce. The pottery dated mainly to the Ġgantija and Tarxien phase, with very few sherds from the Tarxien cemetery phase. The site included remains of a Roman period house, with mosaic floors.

See also 

 List of megalithic sites

Notes

References

External links
OMNIA - Hal Ginwi (Malta)

Neolithic sites
Megalithic Temples of Malta
Żejtun
National Inventory of the Cultural Property of the Maltese Islands